Sergio Castaño Ortega (born 2 February 1982) is a Spanish former footballer who played as a defensive midfielder, currently assistant manager of CD Eldense.

Playing career
Castaño was born in Dos Hermanas, Province of Seville. An unsuccessful youth graduate of Sevilla FC, he went on to represent Dos Hermanas CF, Real Zaragoza B, Xerez CD, Pontevedra CF– two spells – AD Ceuta, CE L'Hospitalet and Arroyo CP.

With the exception of Andalusia's Xerez (Segunda División), all of Castaño's career was spent in the lower leagues. In 2014, aged 32, he moved to the Tercera División with CD Gerena.

Coaching career
After retiring, Castaño worked as assistant manager under José Juan Romero at Gerena, Betis Deportivo Balompié and AD Ceuta FC.

References

External links

1982 births
Living people
Footballers from Dos Hermanas
Spanish footballers
Association football midfielders
Segunda División players
Segunda División B players
Tercera División players
Sevilla Atlético players
Atlético Dos Hermanas CF players
Real Zaragoza B players
Xerez CD footballers
Pontevedra CF footballers
AD Ceuta footballers
CE L'Hospitalet players
CD Gerena players